Anda, officially the Municipality of Anda,  is a 5th class municipality in the province of Bohol, Philippines. According to the 2015 census, it has a population of 16,462 people.

In 2006, the Anda red hermatite print petroglyphs of Bohol were included in the tentative list of the Philippines for UNESCO World Heritage Site under the name of Petroglyphs and Petrographs of the Philippines, which also includes the Singnapan charcoal-drawn petrographs of southern Palawan, Angono Petroglyphs of Rizal province, Alab petroglyphs of Mountain province, and charcoal-drawn Penablanca petrographs of Cagayan.

Etymology

The decree in 1875 on the separation of Quinale from Guindulman did not explain why the name "Anda" was chosen. It was presumed that the name referred to Governor General Simón de Anda y Salazar who was Governor General of the Philippines from 1769 to 1770. Simon de Anda was a member of the Royal Audiencia in the Philippines who did not surrender to the British in 1762. But considering a century gap between de Anda and the time of the town's creation and also taking into account the poor literacy of the populace at that time, the naming of the town after him may not be the case.  A more acceptable reason from oral history, is that "Anda" is a reference to the land that moves forward, as in Spanish "el lugar anda" – the land walks or moves.  This was a rough attempt to translate "Quinale" into Spanish.  The word "quinale" or "gui kale", is a colloquial local term for a pile of sand dunes caused by the waves enhancing a new land mass. Hence, Anda, which means "it walks."

History

The first inhabitants of the area were migrant Negritos, who were eventually replaced by Austronesians coming from Butuan. The new migrants established the red hematite petrographs in the Anda peninsula and would become a sacred site for ethnic communities. During the first half of the 16th century, the Sultanate of Ternate ransacked the area, along with the communities of western Bohol, specifically, the Kedatuan of Dapitan. When the Spanish arrived during the later half of the 16th century, the Anda communities were easily subjugated as they have already been ravaged by the Ternate people.

The municipality of Anda was formerly known as Quinale and was a barrio of the municipality of Guindulman from the early part of its civilization up to the later decades of the 19th century. At the onset, Quinale was basically uninhabited with plenty of uncultivated lands and its shores were swampy with many mangroves and hardwood trees.

Through the years the population of Quinale grew and the people sought independence from Guindulman. On 8 July 1856 they petitioned for independence and the petition was endorsed by the Assessor General of the government to the Governor General of the Philippines on 3 September 1856. Yet their petition was denied for the reason that they could not meet the required number of 500 tributes or taxpayers.

Undaunted, they again petitioned to become an independent town on 30 December 1872. The petition was addressed to the Provincial Governor of Bohol and endorsed by him to the "Consejo de Administracion de Filipinas (Council for Administration of the Philippines), the Father Provincial of the Recollects and the Archbishop of Manila".

The town has progressed at that time. Public buildings and their church were improved and roads created leading to Guindulman. But in spite of these developments, their petition was again denied on the grounds that their total taxpayers reached only 400.

Still persistent, Quinale again filed their petition on 27 March 1874 which was subsequently declined because of the same reason, lack of taxpayers. A few months later, on 23 September 1874, the people again made another petition but now used a different approach and reasoning.

They were denied for the same reasons yet they pointed out that births in the town of Quinale far exceeded the number of deaths but the people migrated to other places because of lack of supervision and opportunities. To answer this need, the officials wanted their barrio to be made into a town to have proper supervision and leadership. With these, the people would not leave and the number of taxpayers would surely reach 500.

Provincial politico-military governor Don Joaquin Bengoechea (June 1872 – 1878), was amenable to their line of reasoning and suggested that the people make a petition for separation of Quinale in the civil aspect only since the requirement of 500 taxpayers was for becoming a separate parish. So the 23 September 1874 petitioned for becoming a town in the civil aspect only.

More than six months passed before the Consejo de Administration finally recommended that Quinale be separated in its civil aspect only. Delay was due to the religious authorities' reluctance to approve it.

Finally on 12 March 1875, the governor general Don Jose de Malcampo y Monje issued the decree creating the new town of Anda and its being separated from the town of Guindulman in civil aspect only, consonant with the desire of the religious authorities. Confirmed by the archbishop of Manila, the order of the separation was published on 1 April 1875.

With this approval, the local officials of the new town of Anda and the mother town of Guindulman gathered to discuss and determine the boundaries of the two towns on 3 May 1875. With the decree, the people were still given the opportunity to till their lands wherever they may be located, in Anda or Guindulman.

As the new town now being established with its defined boundaries, a practical concern of the local officials arose: they had no knowledge of running the local government.  Hence they requested an educated person from the mother town of Guindulman to assist the local officials run the local government.  That person was Pablo Juliano Castro an illegitimate son of a Spanish priest in Guindulman who had had a privileged education in Manila. He was given a prime lot in the center of the town, near the proposed Municipal Hall and the proposed school building.  Pablo Castro not only acted as advisor of the local administration but also acted as the first Justice of Peace and Anda's first school teacher.  He served some time later also as the town's "Capitan Municipal" or town's chief executive at the turn of the century.

Subsequent years saw Anda's growth in terms of population. People did not migrate any more and eventually the number of taxpayers increased until they qualified to be a separate town in the religious aspect. On 18 July 1885, Anda became an independent parish from Guindulman and become a diocesan parish on 19 March 1885, dedicated to the Santo Niño or the Holy Child. Royal approval was given on 6 January 1885 and finally implemented on 18 July 1885 with Fr. Julian Cisnero as the first Parish Priest.

The line of Spanish priests serving the parish of Anda was not broken from 1885 up to 1937, even after the end of the Spanish regime and through the American era. At the end of the Spanish regime, many Spanish priests fled but not Fr. Hilario Lopez. Even after the American era, priests from the Order of the Augustinian Recollect continued to serve the people until 1937. The last Spanish priest was Fr. Luis Llorente.

Geography

Barangays
Anda comprises 16 barangays:

Climate

Demographics

Economy

Government

During the Spanish period the town chief executive was called "Capitan Municipal", then some time during the American regime, the title was changed to "Presidente Municipal". It was only during wartime time that the town chief executive was called a "Municipal Mayor".

In the earliest time, the town chief executive was chosen by drawing of lots among prominent persons of the town, those considered to have ample land properties and adequate education.   The sequence or order of tenure of the early town executives could not easily be determined.  It was only during the American regime that regular elections were held every three years, and then later reduced to four years. For a short period from 1986 to 1988, right after the EDSA Revolution, there were no elections for mayor but only officer-in-charge to act as mayor ad interim.

List of former chief executives
Capitan Municipal (from 1885 to 1919):

 Silverio Escobido
 Gabriel Escobido
 Perfecto Paguia
 Benedicto Amper
 Pablo Castro
 Esteban Escobido
 Esteban Escobal
 Lucio Felisarta
 Ramon Escobia
 Victor Paguia
 Hipolito Paguia
 Cipriano Bernido
 Eulogio Dagondon
 Valentin Timaan
 Bernabe Amper

Presidente Municipal (from 1919 to 1934):
 Victor Felicita1919–1921
 Diosdado Paguia1922–1925
 Victor Felicita1926–1931
 Alfonso Castillo1931–1934
 Diosdado Paguia1934–1937

Municipal Mayor (from 1938 up to the present):

 Alfonso Castillo1938–1940
 Vicente de los Angeles1941–1945
 Aquilino Deligero1945–1955
 Alfonso Castillo1956–1959
 Simeon Escobia1960–1963
 Teodulfo Amora1964–1971
 Concordia Makinano1972–1980
 Teodulfo Amora1980–1986
 Gaudioso AmoraMar1986–Nov1987
 Edilberto Llido1–14Dec1987
 Aquilino Deligero15Dec1987–6Feb1988
 Paulino Amper7Feb1988–May 1996
 Angelina SimacioMay 1996–May 2000
 Paulino AmperMay 2000 – 2010
 Angelina SimacioMay 2010–May 2013
 Metodio AmperMay 2013–present

References

External links

 [ Philippine Standard Geographic Code]
Bohol.gov.ph: Municipality of Anda
Dive Sites of Anda

Municipalities of Bohol
Beaches of the Philippines